Richard Adrian Bourne (born 9 December 1954) is an English former professional footballer. He played as a central defender.

Bourne joined Colchester United as a junior, making his league debut in the 1971–72 season. He eventually signed professional in April 1973, but failed to make any further league appearances for the Layer Road side after that season.  He subsequently played for Ramsgate before joining Bath City.

He was playing for Bath City in June 1979 (having joined them at least prior to April 1976 when he joined Torquay United. He lasted 3 seasons at Plainmoor, scoring 7 times in 68 league games before leaving for non-league Weymouth. He had a benefit match at Weymouth in 1989.

References

1954 births
Living people
Sportspeople from Colchester
English footballers
Association football defenders
Colchester United F.C. players
Ramsgate F.C. players
Bath City F.C. players
Torquay United F.C. players
Weymouth F.C. players
English Football League players